Belle Shenkman,  (June 24, 1928 - March 11, 1995) was a Ukrainian-born, London-based Canadian arts patron and fundraiser.

Early life
Belle Shenkman was born as Bell Gubler was born on June 24, 1928, in Kiev, Ukraine. She emigrated to Canada with her parents when she was three months old.

Career
Shenkman organized the first European performance by the National Ballet of Canada, held at the London Coliseum in 1972. She became a member of the Order of Canada in 1979.

Shenkman raised £30,000 for the Royal Winnipeg Ballet in 1982. As a result, it performed at Sadler's Wells in London.

Personal life, death and legacy
Shenkman, then Miss Gubler, married Harold Shenkman in 1948. They had a son, William, and a daughter, Dasha, and later divorced. She married Desmond Smith in 1979; he died in 1991.

Shenkman died on March 11, 1995, in London, U.K. The Belle Shenkman Room at the Royal Academy of Arts is named in her memory.

References

1928 births
1995 deaths
Canadian patrons of the arts
Soviet emigrants to Canada
Canadian expatriates in the United Kingdom
Members of the Order of Canada
20th-century philanthropists